Jenkins' Trans-Allegheny Raid was a Confederate cavalry expedition in the American Civil War that took place in Western Virginia (now West Virginia) and Ohio during August and September 1862. The raid was led by Brigadier General Albert G. Jenkins, and it started on August 22 as a preliminary step in Confederate Major General William W. Loring's military campaign to drive the Union Army out of the Kanawha River Valley. That campaign, known as the Kanawha Valley Campaign of 1862, took place from September 6 through September 16. The purpose of Jenkins' raid was to get behind the Union army outposts located near the beginning of the Kanawha River, and cut off their main route of retreat to the safety of Ohio.

On the journey to his destination, Jenkins was able to capture several towns and seize valuable supplies and weaponry. He crossed the Ohio River into the state of Ohio, becoming the first Confederate force to invade that state. He moved back into Virginia and reached Buffalo, Virginia, on September 5. By occupying a position along the Kanawha River between the Union army and Ohio, he completed his assignment to block the Union army's most direct route of retreat. On the same day, Loring began a march with four brigades toward the Union outposts. 

On September 8 Jenkins and a small detachment of his men were attacked by a detachment from the 2nd Loyal Virginia Cavalry, but Jenkins escaped. Although Union leaders believed Jenkins had been removed as a threat, Jenkins was able to regroup and move south up the Guyandotte River. He eventually circled north and waited where the Coal River empties into the Kanawha River. Lightburn, in his retreat after a defeat in the Battle of Charleston on September 13, avoided Jenkins by taking a road north towards Ripley, Virginia, instead of following the turnpike along the Kanawha River.

Background

The Commonwealth of Virginia ratified an Ordinance of Secession that declared secession from the United States on May 23, 1861, and later joined other southern states in the Confederate States of America. Many people in the western portion of Virginia preferred to remain loyal to the United States, and they declared their own statehood on October 24, 1861—but the region did not officially become the state of West Virginia until June 20, 1863.

During 1861, Union forces commanded by Major General Jacob Dolson Cox gained control of a large portion of southwestern Virginia along the Kanawha River Valley. The western portion of Virginia had few good roads and few settlements. Further upstream (with non-navigable portions), the Kanawha River is formed by the meeting of the New River and the Gauley River at the community of Gauley Bridge. That community was important not only for its river connections, but also because the James River and Kanawha Turnpike ran through it and was intersected by another road that ran northeast to Summersville and beyond. 

On August 14, 1862, Cox began moving most of his division to Washington to reinforce another Union army. A small quantity of troops remained near the Kanawha Valley, and were put under the command of Colonel Joseph Andrew Jackson Lightburn. Soon after Cox left the Kanawha Valley, some Union army records were captured, and Confederate leaders learned that Cox had left only 5,000 men in the Kanawha Valley at posts around Gauley Bridge. Major General William W. Loring was ordered to clear the Kanawha Valley of Union soldiers, and then move northeast to form a junction with more Confederate soldiers in the Shenandoah Valley. Part of Loring's plan to eliminate the Union army included having a cavalry force move  through Union–controlled territory to a point on the Kanawha River between Gauley Bridge and the Ohio River—which would block the best route for a Union retreat.

Opposing forces

Union army

Colonel Lightburn assumed command of the Kanawha District on August 17, 1862. His headquarters were located at Gauley Bridge. Under his command were seven infantry regiments and one cavalry regiment, but very few of these forces confronted Jenkins. Once Lightburn knew that Jenkins was between Lightburn's Union force and the Ohio River, he sent six companies from the 2nd Loyal Virginia Cavalry Regiment, plus three companies from the 4th Loyal Virginia Infantry Regiment, to find and confront Jenkins. The cavalry was commanded by Colonel John C. Paxton, and the infantry detachment was commanded by Lieutenant Colonel William H. H. Russell. CompanyB from the 2nd Loyal Virginia, led by Major William Powell, fought against Jenkins' men and almost captured Jenkins. The other forces that fought Jenkins at various locations in western Virginia were stationed far from Gauley Bridge and not directly under Lightburn's command. One of the larger Union forces was stationed at Spencer, Virginia, and consisted of five companies of the 11th Loyal Virginia Infantry Regiment. Their commander was Colonel John C. Rathbone. Also at Spencer was a company of independent scouts known as the "Snakehunters", and they were commanded by Captain John P. Baggs. Rathbone's force totaled to about 300 men, although 100 men were poorly-equipped or unarmed.

Confederate army

Major General William W. Loring commanded the Department of Southwestern Virginia. Before he began his objective to drive the Union army out of the Kanawha Valley, he wanted to have a force behind the Union army that would cut off the major Union retreat route to the safety of Ohio. This blocking force consisted of cavalry commanded by Brigadier General Albert G. Jenkins. Under his command were seven companies from the 8th Virginia Cavalry Regiment led by Colonel J. M. Corns, and five more companies of mounted men led by Captain W. R. Preston. Many of Preston's men would eventually become part of the 14th Virginia Cavalry Regiment. At the start of the raid, Jenkins' entire force numbered 550 to 600 men, although its size varied during the raid. Union Colonel Lightburn, in his report, stated that Jenkins' force was 1,200 to 1,500 when it was attacked at Barboursville.

Jenkins' moves north

Confederate Major General Loring planned to take control of the Kanawha River Valley by leading a large force in an assault of Union forces located in Raleigh, Fayette, and Kanawha counties. As part of the plan, Jenkins needed to get behind the Union fortifications to block a Union retreat down the Kanawha River.

Lightburn eventually received reports that Loring was at Lewisburg (he was actually further south) with a force of 10,000 troops. Loring's force actually consisted of about 5,000 men instead the rumored 10,000, but he expected to add to it by recruiting and organizing existing local militias.

To the railroad
On August 22, Jenkins began his mission to attack the Baltimore and Ohio Railroad and then move to the rear of Lightburn's Union force. At least one historian believes that Loring knew that Jenkins would not be able to damage the railroad, but that the railroad portion of the mission was a diversionary movement that would draw attention away from Loring's front—and also draw attention away from Jenkins' principal goal of cutting off the Union route of retreat. Jenkins began this mission by moving north from Salt Sulphur Springs. He quickly found it necessary to send one company on another mission. He also left another company behind because it did not have enough ammunition. The size of his mounted force was about 550 men.

Jenkins' route began with a northern movement in the Cheat River Valley. Here he learned that the much larger force at the Union post, which blocked his path to the railroad, would be difficult to attack. Although Jenkins was temporarily joined by 300 irregular cavalrymen commanded by Colonel John Imboden, he decided to bypass the Union fortification. Imboden occupied the Union soldiers while Jenkins moved west for the second part of his mission. Jenkins' artillery was sent back to Salt Sulphur Springs, while the remaining force struggled west on a crude bridle path across Randolph County's Rich Mountain.

Jenkins moves west toward Ohio

Buckhannon
After moving through Randolph County, Jenkins turned north on August 30 and began moving down French Creek to the community of Buckhannon, county seat of Upshur County. During this movement, his men were often harassed by pro-Union Home Guard. Arriving at Buckhannon near 3:00pm, Jenkins approached the town with most of his men dismounted. Waiting for the Confederates were a light artillery company, a company of militia, and a new company of 60 regulars from the 10th Loyal Virginia Infantry Regiment) commanded by Captain Lewis M. Marsh. The Union companies were deployed on Water Tank Hill, causing some locals to now call this fight the "Battle of Water Tank Hill".

After firing a round or two, the Union forces fled, and Jenkins captured the town. Jenkins reported casualties of four wounded. He also reported Union casualties of 12 to 15 killed or wounded, and 20 taken prisoner—including Marsh. Captain Marsh was said to have stated that the entire Union force numbered about 200. Using captured arms and ordnance, Jenkins was able to resupply his poorly-armed men with Enfield and Harper's Ferry rifles. Anything else of value was destroyed. At midnight, Jenkins began moving west toward Weston.

Weston and Glenville
Many of the communities encountered by Jenkins were small. For example: the 1860 U.S. Census lists the population of Weston as 820. Glenville had a population of 398, and Spencer had a population of 196. Jenkins arrived at Weston at dawn on August 31. It was raining and foggy, which allowed the six companies from the 6th Loyal Virginia Infantry Regiment to escape from town before Jenkins surrounded it. The Union commander, Lieutenant Henry Hoy, remained in town and joined Jenkins' men in plundering. Late that evening, Jenkins began moving west toward Gilmer County.

By 11:00am on September 1, Jenkins was close enough to see the small community of Glenville in the distance. Glenville was defended by the 165th Militia, Gilmer County. The militia fired two volleys at Jenkins' advance guard before fleeing into the woods. Jenkins's men rested for the remainder of the day at Glenville, and then they resumed their westward march at midnight.

Spencer

Colonel John C. Rathbone was the Union commander at the small community of Spencer. He was also involved with oil fields at Burning Springs. Under Rathbone's command were five companies from the 11th Loyal Virginia Infantry. Also present was an independent company known as the "Snakehunters" that eventually became CompanyA of the 11th Loyal Virginia. The total Union force numbered nearly 300, although about 100 men were poorly equipped. On the morning of September 2, Rathbone received information that Confederate cavalry were moving toward Spencer. He did not make any adjustments to his pickets, and did not send a detachment to find the enemy force.

Jenkins arrived at Spencer around 4:00pm. He posted his men on nearby hills with the line stretched thin to give the illusion that his force was larger than what it was. He sent three men under a flag of truce to negotiate a surrender of the Union force. Rathbone summoned all officers to a council of war, and he was urged remain in town and fight. Concerned that Rathbone was going to surrender, about 70 men left town and escaped. Rathbone and his second–in–command, Major George Trimble, believed they were surrounded by as many as 1,100 men. Rathbone surrendered unconditionally, and arms were stacked. Without firing a shot, 218 men were surrendered. Jenkins and his men entered town, and they destroyed weapons and supplies other than what they took for themselves. They paroled 170 men. The incident became known as "Rathbone's Folly". It caused Rathbone and Trimble to be dismissed, for cowardly conduct, from the Union Army on January 6, 1863. Rathbone had his dismissal revoked on May 18, 1866.

Ohio
Jenkins left Spencer on the morning of September 3, and arrived at Ripley in the evening. The town is only  from the Ohio River. He found no resistance from the town. A Union army paymaster was captured along with $5,525. Further west, news of the surrender at Spencer arrived at the town of Ravenswood, which is located on the Virginia side of the Ohio River. Lieutenant Colonel Daniel E. Frost of the 11th Loyal Virginia Infantry (and brother-in-law of Rathbone) was in charge of the Union army post at Ravenswood. His scouts were at Ravenswood when Jenkins entered Ripley. The town evacuated people and military supplies.

Jenkins arrived at Ravenswood around 11:00am on September 4. As he approached, about 250 defenders fled the town and crossed the Ohio River. Jenkins' men rested in town and took supplies from local stores. Occasionally, they were shot at by locals on the Ohio side of the river. Just before sunset, Jenkins brought a portion of his command over the Ohio River into Ohio. This was the first Confederate invasion of Ohio, and the crossing was made at Sand Creek Riffle. Jenkins left a portion of his men in Virginia with instructions to meet on the Virginia side at Point Pleasant near the mouth of the Kanawha River. Colonel James Corns of the 8th Virginia Cavalry Regiment commanded this group. In Ohio, Jenkins took possession of the town of Racine. He warned the locals that if his men were harmed, he would burn the town. He also stated that his purpose in Ohio was to obtain horses and supplies. Although he did not burn the town, he caused panic in Ohio and nearby states. After midnight, he crossed back into Virginia at Wolf's Bar near Racine.

Jenkins moves into position on Kanawha River

The town was located where the Kanawha River emptied into the Ohio River, and had a sheltered defending force. Early in the raid, Jenkins had sent his artillery away, so an attack on Point Pleasant would be difficult. Instead, Jenkins made a feint toward Point Pleasant, but took his command to the small town of Buffalo located up the Kanawha River. His mission was accomplished by September 5, and Union forces upriver were not sure of his location. An Ohio newspaper believed he had 1,500 men, and 2,000 more were expected to join him. On the next day, Loring began moving north toward the Union outposts near the Kanawha River.

The news of Loring advancing from the south, plus Jenkins between Lightburn and Ohio, reached the Union camps in early September. A large portion of the 2nd Loyal Virginia Cavalry, commanded by Colonel John C. Paxton, was sent to find and confront Jenkins. In addition, three companies from the 4th Loyal Virginia Infantry were also sent to pursue Jenkins. Their commander was Lieutenant Colonel William H. H. Russell. On September 8, the Union cavalry discovered that Jenkins had his headquarters at the William C. Miller house near Barboursville, and Jenkins was thought to be planning a move toward Charleston on the next day. That evening, Major William H. Powell led a company of cavalry to the Miller house. The house was surrounded, but Jenkins and his staff had already escaped through the rear garden. The entire Confederate force abandoned its camp and fled up the Guyandotte River towards Logan and Wyoming counties.

Over the next week, Loring attacked Union troops in the counties near the beginning of the Kanawha River. His first major victory was achieved in the Fayetteville on September 10, and the two sides skirmished at points between Fayetteville and Charleston such as Cotton Hill and Montgomery's Ferry. Although news of the event at Barboursville led Lightburn to believe that the threat from Jenkins was eliminated, that was not entirely true. During Loring's fighting in Fayette County, Jenkins moved his troops to Logan Court House and then Wyoming Court House. Unable to communicate with Loring, he eventually moved his men west to Kanawha County at the mouth of the Coal River (a.k.a. Coalsmouth) in an attempt to block any Union retreat.

Lightburn continued a retreat down the Kanawha River, using a turnpike that ran adjacent to the river. His troops were defeated by Loring in the Battle of Charleston on September 13. Lightburn burned a bridge across the Elk River at Charleston and continued his retreat. Fearing that Jenkins' men or Confederate militia were waiting further down the Kanawha River, Lightburn took a road north to Ripley and crossed the Ohio River at Ravenswood. His troops then moved on the Ohio side of the river to a location opposite Point Pleasant at the mouth of the Kanawha River. Loring had driven Lightburn's Union army out of the Kanawha River Valley and back to Ohio.

Aftermath
The Official Record labels Jenkins' raid as "Jenkins' Expedition in West Virginia and Ohio", and uses the dates of August 22 – September 19, 1862. Historian Terry Lowry calls the event "Jenkins' Trans-Allegheny Raid", and his book's chapter devoted to the raid ends on September9,1862.

In Loring's September 20 report, he praised Jenkins and claimed that Jenkins "captured and paroled near 300 prisoners of war; killed, wounded, and dispersed about 1,000 of the enemy; reclaimed to the Government about 40,000 square miles, then in the possession of the enemy...destroyed at least 5,000 stand of small–arms, one piece of cannon, and immense stores...." Jenkins' report mentions only seven Confederate casualties, and it says nothing about the event at the Miller house near Barboursville. Cox wrote that "little real mischief was done" by Jenkins' raid, but it was one of the causes of Lightburn's "embarrassing" retreat. Cox was ordered to return to the Kanawha Valley and promoted to major general. On October 14, he was at Point Pleasant preparing to retake the valley. By October 30, Union troops occupied Charleston, and began moving further east.

In December 1862, Lightburn was transferred to the XV Corps commanded by Major General William T. Sherman, and he became a brigade commander. He was eventually promoted to brigadier general. He was slightly wounded in the face on August 24, 1864. He recovered from his wound and continued serving until he resigned on June 22, 1865. Jenkins did not survive the war. He led a brigade in the Battle of Gettysburg, and he was wounded on July 2, 1863. He recovered by autumn of that year, and returned to operate in western Virginia. Jenkins was wounded and captured on May 9, 1864, in the Battle of Cloyd's Mountain. He died from his wound on May 24 in Dublin, Virginia. After the war, Cox became governor of Ohio. He also served as secretary of the interior in President Grant's administration, and served in the United States House of Representatives.

Preservation
Highway markers commemorate some of Jenkins' exploits in his 1862 raid. One exists at Salt Sulphur Springs in West Virginia's Monroe County. Another marker, titled Capture of Spencer, is located in Upshur County at Spencer.
Three historical markers commemorate the invasion of Ohio by Jenkins. In West Virginia, a highway marker titled "Ohio River Ford" marks the spot at Ravenswood where Jenkins (and Lightburn) crossed into Ohio. An additional marker discusses Daniel Frost, and it mentions that his newspaper was burned during Jenkins's raid. On the Ohio side, a historical marker titled "First Ohio Invasion" discusses the invasion, and is placed at Buffington Island north of the actual crossing point.

See also
 Gen. Albert Gallatin Jenkins House
 List of West Virginia Civil War Confederate units
 List of West Virginia Civil War Union units
 West Virginia in the Civil War

Notes

Footnotes

Citations

References

External links

 Statement on Albert G. Jenkins by Marshall University Board of Governors
 The First Confederate Invasion of Ohio – The Cleveland Civil War Roundtable

1862 in the American Civil War
Military operations of the American Civil War in West Virginia
Cavalry raids of the American Civil War